Vista del Lago High School may refer to:

 Vista del Lago High School (Folsom, California)
 Vista del Lago High School (Moreno Valley, California)